Inna Semenivna Bulkina (12 November 1963 – 20 January 2021) was a Ukrainian literary critic, writer and editor.

Biography 
Bulkina was born on 12 November 1963 in the city of Kiev, Ukrainian SSR.

In the 1980s, she attended the University of Tartu in the Estonian SSR. Her master's thesis was titled "" (English: "Author's collections of EA Baratynsky against the background of the tradition of the Russian poetry collection of the first half of the XIX century"), which she defended in 1993. Her doctoral dissertation was titled "" (English: "Kyiv in Russian literature during the first third of the XIX century"), and she graduated with a PhD from the University of Tartu.

Bulkina studied 19th-century Russian poetry and Soviet and post-Soviet culture in Russia and Ukraine.

She was a columnist for the Russian Journal, as well as a writer for various magazines and websites. Her writing focused on literature and socio-political topics, including on Kyiv's place in Russian and Ukrainian culture, the Russian war against Ukraine, and modern Ukrainian literature.

Bulkina was the author of the project "Magazine Pulp", and compiled the anthologies  (English: Kyiv.

Bulkina died unexpectedly in Kyiv on 20 January 2021.

References 

1963 births
2021 deaths
20th-century journalists
21st-century journalists
Ukrainian editors
Ukrainian literary critics
Ukrainian women journalists
20th-century Ukrainian women writers
21st-century Ukrainian women writers
University of Tartu alumni
Journalists from Kyiv
Ukrainian women editors
Women literary critics